Touch Me is the second studio album by English glam rock singer Gary Glitter. It was originally released in June 1973, on the label Bell. It is Glitter's bestselling album, peaking at No. 2 on the UK Albums Chart. It features the top 5 hits "Do You Wanna Touch Me" and "Hello, Hello, I'm Back Again".

In 1996, the album was reissued as a picture disc that was limited to 5,000 copies, which had a slightly differing track listing to the original album (including four added tracks: "Oh Yes! You're Beautiful", "I Would If I Could but I Can't", "I'm Right, You're Wrong, I Win!" and "I'll Carry Your Picture Everywhere".

2009 reissue
The album was reissued in 2009 by the label Airmail Records including four bonus tracks: "Oh Yes! You're Beautiful", "I Would If I Could but I Can't", "I'm Right, You're Wrong, I Win!" and "Thank You Baby for Myself".

Critical reception
Donald A. Guarisco of AllMusic gave the album two and a half out of five stars and wrote that "Touch Me lacks the strength or variety that would allow it to appeal to anyone beyond glam rock's cult audience but it contains enough solid songs to appeal to lovers of glam."

Track listing

Early CD releases switch sides.

Personnel
Technical
John Hudson - engineer, recording supervisor
Shepard Sherbell - photography

Chart performance

Weekly charts

Certifications

References

External links

1973 albums
Gary Glitter albums
Bell Records albums